The 2010 NCAA Division III men's basketball tournament was a single-elimination tournament to determine the men's collegiate basketball national champion of National Collegiate Athletic Association (NCAA) Division III.

The tournament began on March 4, 2010 and concluded with the national championship game on March 20, 2010 at the Salem Civic Center in Salem, Virginia.

The tournament was won by the University of Wisconsin-Stevens Point, which defeated Williams College, 78–73, in the title game.  The championship was the third in the Pointers' history and first since 2005.

Qualifying teams

Brackets
Results to date 

* – Denotes overtime period

Williamstown, MA Regional

Greensboro, NC Regional

Stevens Point, WI Regional

St. Mary's City, MD Regional

Final Four – Salem, VA

See also
2010 NCAA Division III women's basketball tournament
2010 NCAA Division I men's basketball tournament
2010 NCAA Division II men's basketball tournament
2010 NAIA Division I men's basketball tournament
2010 NAIA Division II men's basketball tournament

References

External links
 Official bracket at D3boards.com

NCAA Division III men's basketball tournament
Ncaa Tournament
2010 in sports in Virginia